Nonomura (written: 野々村) is a Japanese surname. Notable people with the surname include:

George Nonomura (born 1958), American fencer
, Japanese artistic gymnast
 (born 1972), Japanese footballer

Fictional characters:
, character in the visual novel series Triangle Heart
, character in the video game series Bloody Roar

Japanese-language surnames